Lukinskaya is a rural locality (a village) in Rezhskoye Rural Settlement, Syamzhensky District, Vologda Oblast, Russia. The population was 48 as of 2002. There are 2 streets.

Geography 
Lukinskaya is located 46 km northeast of Syamzha (the district's administrative centre) by road. Koltyrikha is the nearest rural locality.

References 

Rural localities in Syamzhensky District